Lynne McNaughton is the tenth bishop of Kootenay, a diocese in the Anglican Church of Canada, and is the 13th metropolitan of the Ecclesiastical Province of British Columbia and Yukon.

Early life and education

Archbishop McNaughton was born in Peace River, Alberta and educated at the University of Alberta,  Vancouver School of Theology and Columbia Theological Seminary.

Ordained ministry
She was ordained in 1987, and served in the Diocese of New Westminster until her episcopal election. Her last post was Rector of St. Clement, North Vancouver.

Episcopal ministry
The Rev. Dr. Lynne McNaughton, as she then was, was elected the tenth bishop of Kootenay on January 19, 2019 at the Cathedral Church of St. Michael and All Angels in Kelowna, B.C.  She was consecrated and installed on May 16, 2019. 

On March 6, 2021, she was elected Metropolitan of the Ecclesiastical Province of British Columbia and Yukon; an office that comes with the title archbishop. She was elected by the members of the provincial house of bishops and the electoral college of the province on the first ballot. She is the second woman to become the Metropolitan of the Ecclesiastical Province of British Columbia and Yukon. The first was her predecessor, the Most Reverend Melissa M. Skelton, who retired on February 28, 2021.

References

21st-century Anglican Church of Canada bishops
Metropolitans of British Columbia
Living people
Year of birth missing (living people)
People from Northern Sunrise County
University of Alberta alumni